Guinevere Jones is a fantasy television series and a series of four novels created by Elizabeth Stewart. It revolves around the adventures of the title character as she uses magic to fight evil, while at the same time dealing with problems and difficulties of high school. The show debuted in Canada on May 4, 2002, on YTV and ten days later in Australia. It ran for twenty-six episodes over two seasons.

Cast

Main
 Tamara Hope as Gwen Jones:The main protagonist. Gwen is an independent, passionate and temperamental fourteen-year-old living in a strange world, using magic to fight evil. She learns that she is the reincarnation of the 6th century British queen Guinevere, who betrayed King Arthur and brought Camelot to ruin. Gwen was adopted by the Rosens to live with after her mother was sent to the mental hospital. Reluctantly, she takes on the role of the hero, fighting dark magic, mentored by Merlin. (Note: Tamara Hope also portrays Queen Guinevere in flashbacks)
 Greta Larkins as Tasha Myers:Tasha is Gwen's intelligent and wacky best friend, and Josh's sister. She doesn't care about fitting in and shops at thrift stores, not always by choice, but that's how it is when money's a little tight. She works at a cafe called the Arc which is frequented by students at the school. She's a loyal sidekick to Gwen and with her knowledge of magic, she helps Gwen battle evil.
 Damien Bodie as Josh Myers:Josh is the utter opposite of his younger sister, Tasha. He is very much a foil to his sister. He's clean cut, responsible, and a hopeless romantic who's smitten with Gwen. He's suspicious of the magic world, but when faced with competition for Gwen's attention, he decides to support Gwen and protect her, even though she doesn't want protection.
 Yani Gellman as Michael Medina:Dark, intense, mysterious - Michael is the bad risk that most girls find irresistible. He's a loner who spends as little time around school as he can get away with. Like Gwen, he's a misfit and an outside, and he confides in her about the miseries of his home life. Gwen agrees to help Tasha win Michael's heart, while secretly harbouring her own feelings. He was unwillingly protected by the fairy Gadowain, until he used a magical gauntlet to repel against him.

Recurring
 Ted Hamilton as Merlin:The wise wizard from the past who guides Gwen in the crusade to shine light into the darkness of human affairs. He and Gwen butt heads frequently, but he has affection and pride in Gwen. He magically projects himself from his own time in the 6th century.
 Aljin Abella as Spencer Huang:He is a friend of Gwen and the gang.
 Bridget Neval as Reine Davidson:The primary antagonist of Gwen and her friends. She has some knowledge of magic herself. She has a crush on Josh, as well as later on Michael.
 Mercia Deane-Johns as Morgana La Faye:The queen of darkness whose purpose is to steer mankind towards the ignorance and conflict that feeds evil and her power. She rivals Merlin in magical skills; however, she is still mortal and will one day die. She is the evil witch who opposes Gwen and Merlin. She is also the evil half-sister of King Arthur.
 Don Halbert as Patrick O'Leary:Mr. O'Leary just seemed to show up one day after a teacher mysteriously falls ill. He's up to something and whenever Gwen turns around, he's there. It is revealed that he is actually Gwen's father. He is also the reincarnation of Mordred.
 Ian Dixon as Gadowain:He is a troublesome fairy, and Michael's protector.

Guest
 Chris Hemsworth as King Arthur:The legendary 6th century King of Britain, and the husband of Guinevere. He was betrayed by Guinevere when she cheated on him with Lancelot, and Camelot was brought to ruin as a result. (Note: He appears only in flashbacks of the series)
 Alex Tsitsopoulos as Lancelot:The legendary Knight of the Round Table in Camelot, whom Guinevere cheated on King Arthur with. (Note: He appeared in only one flashback of the series)
 Vanessa Elliott as Fire Bromsky:She is a member of Reine's gang. Her real name is Frances.
 Katie Campbell as Wind Winters:Her real name is Winifred Winters, is a member of Reine's gang.
 Pepe Trevor as Mrs. Blatt:She is the Socials teacher.
 Dennis Coard as Harve Rosen:He is Gwen's foster father. He and his family live in a thrift store called New Sage which sells magical stuff.
 Briony Behets as Louise Rosen:She is Gwen's foster mother.
 Madeline Page as Katie Dawson:She is Gwen's foster sister and in foster care herself.
 Trudy Hellier as Karen Jones:She is Gwen's mother who was captured by an evil spirit and spent her days in the mental hospital.

Episodes

Season 1 
Season 1 Aired in May, June, and July 2002.

Season 2 
Season 2 aired in September, October, November, and December 2002.

Magic
Based on the discussions in the series, people whose souls have been around for many lifetimes have magical ability. There appears to be a direct relationship between the age of the soul and a character's magic. Gwen, who has had many lifetimes, has powerful magic. Her Mom has some magic but not as much as Gwen. This is specifically discussed in the second episode.

It is specifically mentioned in the fifth episode (Weird Sisters) that objects do not have any magical ability. They just assist the bearer. This does not mean that objects cannot have spells cast on them. For example, the stone from Warwe and Mineer has magic on it.

The glade where Gwen talks to Merlin is near two Ley lines. This allows Gwen to focus her magic better.

Magical artifacts
There are several magical items. The most important is a large fluorescent blue gemstone called Merlin's Stone. It is so powerful that it could allow the bearer to become immortal and break away from the endless cycle of death and rebirth. That is the reason Morgana seeks it.

Formed from a tiny piece of the stone is Gwen's pendant. Assists her in using magic. She has used for some of these purposes: erasing memories, influencing the actions of other people, and moving objects through telekinesis, as well as other purposes. The pendant lights up when near Merlin's stone.

In the first episode, Gwen receives a book from an unknown person. In the third episode the book gets destroyed because evil magic is in it.

Eventually, in Rebellion, it is revealed that Merlin's Stone is actually relatively unimportant; Gwen's Pendant is actually more powerful.

Settings
The majority of the action takes place in several places. The fictional Griffin High School is where most of the scenes involving school take place. It is casually mentioned in the thirteenth episode that the setting is near Melbourne, Australia.

Near the school is a small forest glade where Gwen can talk to Merlin. Merlin mentions that the glade is near where two ley lines intersect. That is also where Gwen learns much of her magic.

The Arc is the cafe and arcade where Tasha works. It is frequented by other students. The store Gwen's foster parents run is called The New Sage. It sells herbs. Gwen and her foster family live on the second floor of that same building. The hospital is called St. James's Hospital.

Production
The series was a co-production between Canada and Australia. The Canadian production companies were Original Pictures Inc and Ibis Entertainment. They are based in Winnipeg. The Australian production company was Crawford Productions. The show was filmed at St. Hellier's Convent, a 120-year-old building and heritage site in Melbourne, Australia.

Airings
Guinevere Jones is or was aired on: YTV and several other networks for its initial run. On March 1, 2005, YTV announced that it would be airing reruns of the show during the last half of March through May. In 2005, it appeared on Disney Channel Italy, Nickelodeon's UK and Middle East channels, and France 2. In Australia it was aired on Network Ten. The show also aired in the UK on Film 24 (Sky 157) on 7 November 2009.

Books
The four novels are a direct novelization of the television series.
The first book is called A River Through Time and covers the events from the first fourth of the series. It was written by Sophie Masson.
Book 2 covers the events of the remainder of the first season. It was written by Felicity Pulman. Its title is Love and Other Magic.
The third book, titled The Dark Side of Magic covers the first part of the second season. It was also written by Pulman.
Book 4, also by Masson, is called No Place Like Home. It covers the events from the last part of the second season.
All four books are published by Random House Australia.

Selected quotes

"I told you, my name is Gwen." - Said by Gwen in every opening credit sequence.
"We all have many lifetimes. We first met when you were King Arthur's queen. Your destiny is magic, Guinevere. Your task is to fight evil." - Said by Merlin in the opening credits.

See also
List of works based on Arthurian legends

External links
Guinevere Jones Online
Guinevere Jones at the Internet Movie Database
Guinevere Jones at the Australian Television

Australian children's television series
Canadian children's fantasy television series
Network 10 original programming
Television shows set in Victoria (Australia)
2002 Canadian television series debuts
2002 Canadian television series endings
2002 Australian television series debuts
2002 Australian television series endings
2000s Canadian teen drama television series
Television shows about reincarnation
Television series about teenagers
Television series based on Arthurian legend
Television series by Crawford Productions
English-language television shows
YTV (Canadian TV channel) original programming